The 1961–62 Challenge Cup was the 61st staging of rugby league's oldest knockout competition, the Challenge Cup.

First round

Second round

Quarterfinals

Semifinals

Final
Wakefield Trinity beat Huddersfield 12-6 in the Challenge Cup Final played at Wembley Stadium before a crowd of 81,263.
This was Wakefield Trinity’s third Challenge Cup final win in four Final appearances. Neil Fox, their centre, was awarded the Lance Todd Trophy for his man-of-the-match performance. This has been the only time in a Rugby League Challenge Cup final that a place kick has not been converted. Fox dropped three goals for Wakefield Trinity, then worth two points each.

References

Challenge Cup
Challenge Cup